The State Information Center (国家信息中心) is a Chinese government policy making think tank affiliated to the National Development and Reform Commission established in 1987. The State Information Center sponsors the China Economic Information Network, a national information network that provides broad information sources about the People's Republic of China's economic activities. The State Information Center serves the interests of the Chinese government and its policies.

See also 
 National Development and Reform Commission
 Think tank
 List of think tanks

References

External links 
  Government agencies of China
Economy of China
National Development and Reform Commission